The Drahura (also: Cacova) is a right tributary of the river Neamț in Romania. It flows into the Neamț in Târgu Neamț.

References

Maps
 Harta turistică, Parcul Vânători-Neamț

Rivers of Romania
Rivers of Neamț County